Medley is a combination of four different swimming styles—backstroke, breaststroke, butterfly, and freestyle—into one race. This race is either swum by one swimmer as individual medley (IM) or by four swimmers as a medley relay.

Individual medley 
Individual medley consists of a single swimmer swimming equal distances of four different strokes within one race.

Stroke order 
Individual medley consists of four strokes. These four strokes go in an order by Butterfly, Backstroke, Breaststroke and finally Freestyle. The swimmer will swim one quarter of the race in each style, in a certain order. The strokes are swum in this order:

 Butterfly
 Backstroke
 Breaststroke
 Freestyle
(4th can be any stroke except butterfly, backstroke, or breaststroke; most swimmers use the front crawl).

Competitions 
A number of competitions in the individual medley are regularly contested, by both men and women. The competitions are limited in that every distance must consist of either four lengths of the pool (100-yard or -meter) or a multiple of four lengths (200- or 400-yard/- meter), so that no stroke must change mid-length. Regardless of the length of the individual medley, each stroke comprises a quarter of the overall distance.

 100 m/yd individual medley: Swam in short-course (25 m/yd pool) competition only. This is not an Olympic event.
 200 m/yd individual medley: Swam in both short course and long-course (50 m pool) competitions. This was swum as an Olympic event in the 1968 Summer Olympics, Mexico City, Mexico but then omitted until the 1984 Summer Olympics, Los Angeles, United States. The event has been swum ever since.
 400 m/yd individual medley: Swum in both short course and long course competitions. This has been an Olympic event since the 1964 Summer Olympics, Tokyo, Japan.

Technique 
The technique for individual medley events does not differ much from the technique for the separate events for the four strokes. The main difference is the turning technique needed at the transition from one stroke to the next stroke. Each section has to be completed as described by the stroke rules of this section.

The butterfly stroke section has to be ended with both hands touching the wall at the same time, but has to leave the wall on the back for backstroke. Swimmers may do this by pulling the knees underneath of their body after touching the wall with both hands, and then rolling backwards on their back, or swinging one arm back and rolling over onto the side of the arm swung back. During the roll in the first method the arms are not stretched, but rather hold close to the body with the hands a few centimeters in front of the chest. This reduces the rotational moment and allows for a faster turn. At the end of the backwards roll the swimmer sinks under water and extends over the head. The swimmer then pushes off the wall with both legs and starts the regular underwater phase of backstroke, usually a dolphin kick for up to 15 m before surfacing and swimming normal backstroke.

The backstroke section has to end with touching the wall while lying on the back. For the subsequent breaststroke the swimmer has to leave the wall on the breast. Most swimmers prefer to do an open turn, simply driving the feet into the wall. The swimmer is then under water face down and extends the hands forward before pushing off the wall with both legs. The swimmer continues with the regular breaststroke, consisting of a gliding phase, an underwater pull-down, and another gliding phase before surfacing and swimming normal breaststroke. A newer, but not required technique for the backstroke to breaststroke turn is a backflip turn. The swimmer touches on his or her backside with one hand. After touching the wall, the swimmer tucks their knees up to their stomach and flips around so that their feet are touching the wall pointing down and they can push off of the wall on their stomach. Another, arguably faster variation of the new backstroke to breaststroke turn is very similar to the regular forward flipturn. The swimmer goes into the wall with their leading arm outstretched behind their head. The swimmer then touches the wall and immediately goes into a frontflip and proceeds with the breaststroke portion of the race. With this turn, it is crucial that the swimmer remains technically on their back until they touch the wall, which means that the front of the body should be rotated chest-side up more than it is chest-side down, otherwise the swimmer will be disqualified.

The breaststroke section has to be ended with both hands touching the wall at the same time while on the breast. A normal breaststroke turn is usually used to turn and push off the wall. After leaving the wall the freestyle underwater phase is initiated, followed by regular freestyle on the surface after up to 15 m underwater. For medley events, freestyle means any style other than backstroke, breaststroke or butterfly. Some form of front crawl is typically used.

Medley relay 
Medley relay consists of four different swimmers in one relay race, each swimming one of the four strokes.

Stroke order 
Medley relay is swum by four different swimmers, each swimming one of the four strokes. The stroke order is different from that of the individual medley. Backstroke is the first event as backstroke is started from the water. If backstroke were not the first event, the starting backstroke swimmer and the finishing previous swimmer could block each other. The remaining strokes are sorted according to the speed, with breaststroke being the slowest and freestyle being the fastest stroke. The order of the strokes is as follows:

 Backstroke
 Breaststroke
 Butterfly
 Freestyle the only limitation being that none of backstroke, breaststroke, or butterfly may be used for this leg. Most swimmers use the front crawl.

Backstroke performances (only) are eligible for backstroke records, as they are performed under normal controlled starting conditions (i.e., reflex latency for the starting gun makes the average split time marginally quicker); for example, Ryan Murphy set the world record for the 100 m backstroke during the first leg of the 4×100 m medley relay at the 2016 Summer Olympics.

Competitions 
There are a number of competitions swum regularly in medley relay, both by men and women.

4×50 m/yd medley relay: Swum in both short course and long course pools. This is not an Olympic event.
4×100 m/yd medley relay: Swum in both short course and long course pools. This was the first Olympic medley competition and has been swum since the 1960 Summer Olympics, Rome, Italy. The first Olympic butterfly event itself was first swum in the previous 1956 Summer Olympics.

Mixed-gendered medley relays were introduced at the 2014 FINA World Swimming Championships (25 m) (4×50 m) and 2015 World Aquatics Championships (4×100 m). The event debuted at the 2020 Summer Olympics (4×100 m).

Standard United States high school swim meets have short course events, that is the lengths are typically swum in a 25-yard or meter long pool. One relay event swum in State or Sectional Championships is the 4×50 yard medley relay.

Many collegiate programs hold competition in the 4×50 medley relay, and 4×100 medley relay.

Technique 
The technique for medley relay events does not differ much from the technique for the separate events for the four strokes. The first swimmer swims the backstroke normally. The only difference for the following swimmers is that there is no start signal, but rather the previous swimmer completing his or her turn by touching the wall signals the start for the subsequent swimmer. It is very important for the next swimmer off the block to accurately judge the time at which the swimmer in the water will touch the wall. A fast reaction could result in a significant time gain in the race, but a false start (diving early) will result in a disqualification.

FINA rules require that a foot of the second, third or fourth swimmer must be contacting the platform while (and before) the incoming teammate is touching the wall; the starting swimmer may already be in motion, however, which saves 0.6–1 seconds compared to a regular start. Furthermore, many swimmers may perform better in a relay than in an individual race owing to a team spirit atmosphere. As a result, relay times are typically 2–3 second faster than the sum of best times of individual swimmers.

History 
Prior to 1952, the butterfly was not defined as a separate stroke from the breaststroke, and so medley races featured only three styles: backstroke, breaststroke, and freestyle. The usual distance of both the IM and the medley relay was thus 300 metres or yards rather than 400. In the United States, during the year of 1953, some medley races included the butterfly stroke, and the Amateur Athletic Union made it mandatory from 1954.

Rules 
These are the official rules of the FINA regarding medley swimming:

 In individual medley events, the swimmer covers the four swimming styles in the following order: butterfly, backstroke, breaststroke and freestyle.
 In medley relay events, swimmers will cover the four swimming styles in the following order: backstroke, breaststroke, butterfly and freestyle.
 Each section must be finished in accordance with the rule which applies to the style concerned.

Freestyle includes a special regulation for medley events:

 Freestyle means that in an event so designated the swimmer may swim any style, except that in individual medley or medley relay events, freestyle means any style other than backstroke, breaststroke or butterfly.

Additionally, the normal rules of relay events apply:

 In relay events, the team of a swimmer whose feet lose touch with the starting platform before the preceding team-mate touches the wall shall be disqualified, unless the swimmer in default returns to the original starting point at the wall, but it shall not be necessary to return to the starting platform.
 Any relay team shall be disqualified from a race if a team member, other than the swimmer designated to swim that length, enters the water when the race is being conducted, before all swimmers of all teams have finished the race.
 The members of a relay team and their order of competing must be nominated before the race. Any relay team member may compete in a race only once. The composition of a relay team may be changed between the heats and finals of an event, provided that it is made up from the list of swimmers properly entered by a member for that event. Failure to swim in the order listed will result in disqualification. Substitutions may be made only in the case of a documented medical emergency.
 Any swimmer having finished his race, or their distance in a relay event, must leave the pool as soon as possible without obstructing any other swimmer who has not yet finished their race. Otherwise the swimmer committing the fault, or their relay team, shall be disqualified.
 There shall be four swimmers on each relay team.
 Mixed relay teams must consist of two men and two women. (In any order)

World records
Men

Women

Mixed

A listing of how the World Records have progressed over time can be found here: 100 IM, 200 IM, 400 IM and Medley Relay.

Olympic or long course world champions in individual medley

Men

Women

See also

List of world records in swimming
200 metres individual medley

References

External links
 Swim.ee: Detailed discussion of swimming techniques and speeds

 
Team sports

he:שחייה תחרותית#מעורב